Metsanurga may refer to several places in Estonia:

Metsanurga, Kernu Parish, village in Kernu Parish, Harju County
Metsanurga, Kiili Parish, village in Kiili Parish, Harju County
Metsanurga, Lääne-Viru County, village in Vihula Parish, Lääne-Viru County
Metsanurga, Kastre Parish, village in Kastre Parish, Tartu County
Metsanurga, Peipsiääre Parish, village in Peipsiääre Parish, Tartu County